Good Job, Brain! is a quiz show and offbeat trivia podcast. Good Job, Brain! began as a Kickstarter project on December 20, 2011. It is distributed on Stitcher, SoundCloud, iTunes, Spotify, and the show's website.

The show's cast play pub trivia together as a team called Baby Dog Time, named for hostess Karen Chu's dog.

The cast wrote a book, Good Job, Brain!: Trivia, Quizzes and More Fun From the Popular Pub Quiz Podcast, published in September 2016.

The show went on hiatus in 2018 and returned on April 26, 2021, for a 10 episode Season 2.

Format
Generally, the program begins with "Pop Quiz, Hotshot", in which Karen reads questions from one randomly chosen Trivial Pursuit card. Most episodes are themed where the hosts prepare trivia and quizzes related to the theme. Every fifth episode is an "All Quiz Bonanza" where each host prepares a non-themed trivia quiz. A podcast listener wrote an "Um, Actually" jingle for Good Job, Brain!.

Recurring segments
 "Um, Actually" – Listener-submitted corrections of facts from previous episodes.
 "Pop Quiz Hotshot" – Episodic general trivia from Trivial Pursuit cards.
 "Brad Pitt or Lasers" – Segment in which players guess the older of two objects, the starting (i.e. Brad Pitt or Lasers)
 "Belgium or Not-Belgium" – Players guess if an object is from Belgium or not.
 "E.L.V.I.S. the robot" – Segment in which players guess the song that the original Macintosh text-to-speech speaks the lyrics to.
 "William Fakespeare" – A fake impersonator of William Shakespeare reads lyrics to pop songs in Elizabethan English, through which players have to translate and guess the song the impersonator is reciting.

Awards and media
Good Job, Brain! was the winner of Stitcher's 2013 "Best Games + Hobbies" podcast. It was named one of The Guardian's "Top 10 US podcasts for road trip listening" in 2013.

The show was nominated in May 2017 by the Academy of Podcasters for the Best Games and Hobbies Podcast award.

Episodes

References

External links
 

Audio podcasts
2012 podcast debuts